So Far: The Acoustic Sessions is a 2008 album by contemporary Christian music artist Bethany Dillon.

Track listing 
"Dreamer"
"When You Love Someone"
"We Can Work It Out"
"Top Of The World"
"Hallelujah"
"All I Need"
"The Kingdom"
"Hero"
"Beautiful"
"Let Your Light Shine"

2008 albums
Bethany Dillon albums